Corry Armory is a historic National Guard armory located at Corry, Erie County, Pennsylvania.  It was built in 1906, and is a "T"-shaped brick building in the Romanesque style. It consists of a three-story, flat roofed administration building, with an attached two-story, gambrel roofed drill hall. It sits on a stone foundation and features brick buttresses with corbeled cornices, slightly raised parapets, and entrance with segmented stone arch.

It was added to the National Register of Historic Places in 1991.

References

Armories on the National Register of Historic Places in Pennsylvania
Romanesque Revival architecture in Pennsylvania
Government buildings completed in 1906
Buildings and structures in Erie County, Pennsylvania
Corry, Pennsylvania
National Register of Historic Places in Erie County, Pennsylvania
1906 establishments in Pennsylvania